Clio Danae Othoneou ( born 30 September 1979) is a Greek actress, musician and pianist.

Family and early life 

She was born September 30, 1979 in Thessaloniki, Greece, where her parents studied, and is the oldest of three daughters. At age two, they moved to Xanthi, her mother's hometown. There she began the first courses of piano in the National Conservatoire of Xanthi at five and a half. A few years later, she moved to Athens suburb of Cholargos, her father's hometown.

Music education 

She continued piano studies in the National Conservatoire, in Athens Conservatoire and the Attica Conservatoire, where she studied with Marina Lamprinoudi, Parry Derempei-Papastavrou and Dionyssis Malloychos. She gave her first public performance at age seven in "Parnassos Hall" in Athens, playing Claude Debussy. From 1996 she appeared in many piano concerts, in various Greek cities. In 1998 she received her degree in piano and in 2000 a diploma Soloist, studying under Dimitris Toufexis.

Theatre education 

She studied for one year in the Superior Dramatic Faculty “ARCHI" of Nelli Karra.  The next year she passed through examinations to enroll in the Superior Dramatic Faculty of National Theatre.  The same period, she studied lyrical music with soprano Irini Karayianni. In 2005 she graduated from the Superior Dramatic Faculty of National Theatre.

References 

1979 births
Living people
Actresses from Athens
Greek classical musicians
Greek classical pianists
Greek women pianists
Greek stage actresses
Greek television actresses
Musicians from Athens
Women classical pianists
21st-century classical pianists
21st-century women pianists